Inverness East, Nairn and Lochaber, may refer to:

 Inverness East, Nairn and Lochaber (UK Parliament constituency), constituency of the House of Commons of the Parliament of the United Kingdom, at Westminster 
 Inverness East, Nairn and Lochaber (Scottish Parliament constituency) constituency of the Scottish Parliament, at Holyrood